Crosstalk: American Speech Music is a compilation album of speech-based music by various composers, poets, visual artists and DJs.

Track listing 
 "Declaratives in First Person" (Pamela Z) – 5:04
 "Electroprayer 5.0" (Guillermo E. Brown) – 3:27
 "Africa(n)" (Tracie Morris) – 3:30
 "In the Basement" (Shelley Hirsch) – 3:08
 "Chatter of Pins" (Paul Lansky) – 11:19
 "The Pink of Stealth" (Mendi Obadike, Keith Obadike) – 6:18
 "Being Black" (DJ Spooky) – 1:15
 "Blimp/Sky [From One Loss Plus]" (Daniel Bernard Roumain) – 5:02
 "The Society Architect Ponders the Golden Gate Bridge" (Peter Gordon/Lawrence Weiner ) – 13:40)
 "Rodeo Red" (Mendi Obadike, Keith Obadike) – 3:10
 "Morning Blues for Yvan" (George Lewis) – 6:12
 "Life Studies, Movement #1" (John Link) – 5:12
 "Redemption Chant 2.0" (Vijay Iyer) – 3:38

References

2008 compilation albums
Compilation albums by American artists 
Electronic compilation albums 
Spoken word albums by American artists
Experimental music compilation albums